Midway may refer to the following places in the U.S. state of Missouri:
Midway, Boone County, Missouri, an unincorporated community
Midway, Lewis County, Missouri, an unincorporated community
Midway, Oregon County, Missouri, an unincorporated community
Midway, Joplin, a former village located in northern Newton County